The ancient Aztecs employed a variety of entheogenic plants and animals within their society. The various species have been identified through their depiction on murals, vases, and other objects.

History 
There are many pieces of archaeological evidence in reference to the use of entheogens early in the history of Mesoamerica. Olmec burial sites with remains of the Bufo toad (Bufo marinus), Maya mushroom effigies, and Spanish writings all point to a heavy involvement with psychoactive substances in the Aztec lifestyle.

The Florentine codex contains multiple references to the use of psychoactive plants among the Aztecs.  The 11th book of the series contains identifications of five plant entheogens.  R. Gordon Wasson, Richard Evans Schultes, and Albert Hofmann have suggested that the statue of Xochipilli, the Aztec 'Prince of Flowers,' contains effigies of a number of plant based entheogens.

The plants were primarily used by the priests, or tlamacazqui, other nobility, and visiting dignitaries.  They would use them for divination much as the indigenous groups of central Mexico do today.  The priests would also ingest the entheogens to engage in prophecy, interpret visions, and heal.

Entheogens

Ololiuqui and Tlitliltzin 
Ololiuqui (Coatl xoxouhqui) was identified as Rivea corymbosa in 1941 by Richard Evans Schultes. The name Ololiuqui refers to the brown seeds of the Rivea corymbosa (Morning Glory) plant.
Tlitliltzin was identified later as being Ipomoea violacea by R. Gordon Wasson. This variation contains black seeds and usually has bluish hued flowers.

The seeds of these plants contain the psychoactive d-lysergic acid amide, or LSA. The preparation of the seeds involved grinding them on a metate, then filtering them with water to extract the alkaloids. The resulting brew was then drunk to bring forth visions.

The Florentine Codex Book 11 describes the Ololiuqui intoxication:

It makes one besotted; it deranges one, troubles one, maddens one, makes one possessed.  He who eats it, who drinks it, sees many things which greatly terrify him.  He is really frightened [by the] poisonous serpent which he sees for that reason.

The morning glory was also utilized in healing rituals by the ticitl.  The ticitl would often take ololiuqui to determine the cause of diseases and illness.  It was also used as an anesthetic to ease pain by creating a paste from the seeds and tobacco leaf, then rubbing it on the affected body part.

Mushrooms 
Called "Teonanácatl" in Nahuatl (literally "god mushroom"—compound of the words teo(tl) (god) and nanácatl (mushroom))—the mushroom genus Psilocybe has a long history of use within Mesoamerica. The members of the Aztec upper class would often take teonanácatl at festivals and other large gatherings.  According to Fernando Alvarado Tezozomoc, it was often a difficult task to procure mushrooms.  They were quite costly as well as very difficult to locate, requiring all-night searches.

Both Fray Bernardino de Sahagún and Fray Toribio de Benavente Motolinia describe the use of the mushrooms.  The Aztecs would drink chocolate and eat the mushrooms with honey.  Those partaking in the mushroom ceremonies would fast before ingesting the sacrament. The act of taking mushrooms is known as monanacahuia, meaning to "mushroom oneself".

Some written observations under the influence of the doctrine of Catholicism recount the use of the mushroom among the Montezumanic people. Allegedly, during the emperor's coronation ceremony, many prisoners were sacrificed, had their flesh eaten, and their hearts removed.  Those who were invited guests to the feast ate mushrooms, which Diego Durán describes as causing those who ate them to go insane. After the defeat of the Aztecs, the Spanish forbade traditional religious practices and rituals that they considered "pagan idolatry", including ceremonial mushroom use.

Sinicuichi 
Not much is known of the use of sinicuichi (alternate spelling ) among the Aztecs. R. Gordon Wasson identified the flower on the statue of Xochipilli and suggested from its placement with other entheogens that it was probably used in a ritualistic context.  Multiple alkaloids have been isolated from the plant; with cryogenine, lythrine, and nesodine being the most important.

Sinicuichi could be the plant tonatiuh yxiuh "the herb of the sun" from the Aztec Herbal of 1552. tonatiuh means sun.  This is interesting because today in Central and South America, sinicuichi is often called abre-o-sol, or the "sun opener." Tonatiuh yxiuh is described as being a summer blooming plant, as is Heimia.

The Herbal also includes a recipe for a potion to conquer fear. It reads:

Let one who is fear-burdened take as a drink a potion made of the herb tonatiuh yxiuh which throws out the brightness of gold.

One of the effects of sinicuichi is that it adds a golden halo or tinge to objects when ingested.

Tlapatl and Mixitl 
Tlapatl and mixitl are both Datura species, Datura stramonium and Datura innoxia, with strong hallucinogenic (deliriant) properties. The plants typically have large, white or purplish, trumpet-shaped flowers and spiny seed capsules, that of D. stramonium being held erect and dehisceing by four valves and that of D. innoxia nodding downward and breaking up irregularly. The active principles are the tropane alkaloids atropine, scopolamine, and hyoscyamine.

The use of datura spans millennia.  It has been employed by both many indigenous groups in North, Central, and South America for a variety of uses. Called toloache today in Mexico, datura species were used among the Aztec for medicine, divination, and malevolent purposes.

For healing, tlapatl was made into an ointment which was spread over infected areas to cure gout, as well as applied as a local anesthetic. The plants were also utilized to cause harm to others.  For example, it was believed that mixitl would cause a being to become paralyzed and mute, while tlapatl will cause those who take it to be disturbed and go mad.

Peyotl 
The cactus known as peyotl, or more commonly peyote (Lophophora williamsii), has a rich history of use in Mesoamerica.  Its use in northern Mexico among the Huichol has been written about extensively.   It is thought that since peyote only grows in certain regions of Mexico, the Aztecs would receive dried buttons through long-distance trade. Peyote was viewed as being a protective plant by the Aztec. Sahagún suggested that the plant is what allowed the Aztec warriors to fight as they did.

Pipiltzintzintli 
R. Gordon Wasson has posited that the plant known as pipiltzintzintli is in fact Salvia divinorum.  It is not entirely known whether or not this plant was used by the Aztecs as a psychotropic, but Jonathan Ott (1996) argues that although there are competing species for the identification of pipiltzintzintli, Salvia divinorum is probably the "best bet."  There are references to use of pipiltzintzintli in Spanish arrest records from the conquest, as well as a reference to the mixing of ololiuqui with pipiltzintzintli.

Contemporaneously, the Mazatec, meaning "people of the deer" in Nahuatl, from the Oaxaca region of Mexico utilize Salvia divinorum when Psilocybe spp. mushrooms are not readily available.  They chew and swallow the leaves of fresh salvia to enter into a shamanic state of consciousness.  The Mazatec use the plant in both divination and healing ceremonies, perhaps as the Aztecs did 500 years ago.  Modern users of Salvia have adapted the traditional method, forgoing the swallowing of juices due to Salvinorin A being readily absorbed by the mucous membranes of the mouth.

Toloatzin 
Toloatzin refers to Datura innoxia specifically, although it is often confused with Datura stramonium in general.

Ad-hocs

Cacahua 
Aztecs combined cacao with psilocybin mushrooms, a polysubstance combination referred to as "cacahua-xochitl", which literally means "chocolate-mushrooms".

At the very first, mushrooms had been served...They ate no more food; they only drank chocolate during the night. And they ate the mushrooms with honey. When the mushrooms took effect on them, then they danced, then they wept.  But some, while still in command of their senses, entered and sat there by the house on their seats; they did no more, but only sat there nodding.

See also 
 Calea ternifolia
 Entheogenic drugs and the archaeological record
 Entheogenics and the Maya
 List of Acacia species known to contain psychoactive alkaloids
 List of plants used for smoking
 List of psychoactive plants
 List of psychoactive plants, fungi, and animals
 N,N-Dimethyltryptamine
 Psilocybin mushrooms
 Psychoactive cacti

References

Sources 
 De Rios, Marlene Dobkin. "Hallucinogens, cross-cultural perspectives." University of New Mexico Press. Albuquerque, New Mexico, 1984.
 Dibble, Charles E., et al. (trans). "Florentine Codex: Book 9." The University of Utah. Utah, 1959.
 Dibble, Charles E., et al. (trans). "Florentine Codex: Book 11 - Earthly Things." The School of American Research. Santa Fe, New Mexico, 1963.
 Elferink, Jan G. R., Flores, Jose A., Kaplan Charles D. "The Use of Plants and Other Natural Products for Malevolent Practices Among the Aztecs and Their Successors." Estudios de Cultura Nahuatl Volume 24, 1994.
 Furst, Peter T. "Flesh of the Gods: The Ritual Use of Hallucinogens." Waveland Press, Prospect Heights, Illinois, 1972.
 Gates, William. "The De La Cruz-Badiano Aztec Herbal of 1552." The Maya Society. Baltimore, Maryland, 1939.
 Hofmann, Albert. "Teonanácatl and Ololiuqui, two ancient magic drugs of Mexico." UNODC Bulletin on Narcotics. Issue 1, pp. 3–14, 1971.
 Ott, Jonathan. "On Salvia divinorum" Eleusis, n. 4, pp. 31–39, April 1996.
 Schultes, Richard Evans. "The Plant Kingdom and the Hallucinogens." UNODC Bulletin on Narcotics. Issue 4, 1969.
 Steck, Francis Borgia. "Motolinia's History of the Indians of New Spain." William Byrd Press, Inc. Richmond, Virginia, 1951.
 Townsend, Richard F. "The Aztecs." Thames & Hudson Inc. New York, New York, 2000.
 Lyncho Ruiz 1996 Balancing Act Research and Education Founder, President, Ecosystem Management Director and Ethnobotanist

External links 
Religion and Psychoactive Sacraments: An Entheogen Chrestomathy

Entheogenic Complex
Entheogens
Mesoamerican medicine